Bartel Leendert van der Waerden (2 February 1903 – 12 January 1996) was a Dutch mathematician and historian of mathematics.

Biography

Education and early career
Van der Waerden learned advanced mathematics at the University of Amsterdam and the University of Göttingen, from 1919 until 1926. He was much influenced by Emmy Noether at Göttingen, Germany. Amsterdam awarded him a Ph.D. for a thesis on algebraic geometry, supervised by Hendrick de Vries. Göttingen awarded him the habilitation in 1928. In that year, at the age of 25, he accepted a professorship at the University of Groningen.

In his 27th year, Van der Waerden published his Moderne Algebra, an influential two-volume treatise on abstract algebra, still cited, and perhaps the first treatise to treat the subject as a comprehensive whole. This work systematized an ample body of research by Emmy Noether, David Hilbert, Richard Dedekind, and Emil Artin. In the following year, 1931, he was appointed professor at the University of Leipzig.

In July 1929 he married the sister of mathematician Franz Rellich, Camilla Juliana Anna, and they had three children.

Nazi Germany
After the Nazis seized power, and through World War II, Van der Waerden remained at Leipzig, and passed up opportunities to leave Nazi Germany for Princeton and Utrecht. However, he was critical of the Nazis and refused to give up his Dutch nationality, both of which led to difficulties for him.

Postwar career
Following the war, Van der Waerden was repatriated to the Netherlands rather than returning to Leipzig (then under Soviet control), but struggled to find a position in the Dutch academic system, in part because his time in Germany made his politics suspect and in part due to Brouwer's opposition to Hilbert's school of mathematics. After a year visiting Johns Hopkins University and two years as a part-time professor, in 1950, Van der Waerden filled the chair in mathematics at the University of Amsterdam. In 1951, he moved to the University of Zurich, where he spent the rest of his career, supervising more than 40 Ph.D. students. 

In 1949, Van der Waerden became member of the Royal Netherlands Academy of Arts and Sciences, in 1951 this was changed to a foreign membership. In 1973 he received the Pour le Mérite.

Contributions
Van der Waerden is mainly remembered for his work on abstract algebra. He also wrote on algebraic geometry, topology, number theory, geometry, combinatorics, analysis, probability and statistics, and quantum mechanics (he and Heisenberg had been colleagues at Leipzig). In later years, he turned to the history of mathematics and science. His historical writings include Ontwakende wetenschap (1950), which was translated into English as Science Awakening (1954), Sources of Quantum Mechanics (1967), Geometry and Algebra in Ancient Civilizations (1983), and A History of Algebra (1985).

Van der Waerden has over 1000 academic descendants, most of them through three of his students, David van Dantzig (Ph.D. Groningen 1931),
Herbert Seifert (Ph.D. Leipzig 1932), and Hans Richter (Ph.D. Leipzig 1936, co-advised by Paul Koebe).

See also

Van der Waerden notation
Van der Waerden number
Van der Waerden's conjecture
Van der Waerden's theorem
Van der Waerden test

Notes

References
 Alexander Soifer (2009), The Mathematical Coloring Book, Springer-Verlag . Soifer devotes four chapters and over 100 pages to biographical material about van der Waerden, some of which he had also published earlier in the journal Geombinatorics.
 Alexander Soifer (2015) The Scholar and the State: In Search of Van der Waerden, Springer books

Further reading
Schlote, K.-H., 2005, "Moderne Algebra" in Grattan-Guinness, I., ed., Landmark Writings in Western Mathematics. Elsevier: 901–16.
 

 Freudenthal, H., 1962, "Review: B. L. van der Waerden, Science Awakening" in Bull. Amer. Math. Soc., 68 (6):543–45.

External links

20th-century Dutch mathematicians
20th-century Dutch historians
1903 births
1996 deaths
Algebraists
Combinatorialists
Historians of mathematics
Academic staff of Leipzig University
Members of the Royal Netherlands Academy of Arts and Sciences
Recipients of the Pour le Mérite (civil class)
Scientists from Amsterdam
University of Amsterdam alumni
Academic staff of the University of Amsterdam
University of Göttingen alumni
Academic staff of the University of Zurich